Vladimir Fyodorovich Promyslov (28 August 1908 – 22 May 1993) was a Russian Soviet Communist political figure. He served as the Mayor of Moscow between 1963 and 1986 and was succeeded by Valery Saikin.

A professional builder, Promyslov graduated from Moscow Construction Engineering Institute, and was appointed head of the Moscow construction department by Nikita Khrushchev. In 1963 he was appointed chairman of the Moscow Executive Committee, a position equivalent to that of Mayor. During his term the Ostankino tower, the Hotel Russia, and dozens of new subway stations were built. In 1980 Moscow hosted the 1980 Summer Olympics, and several sport venues were constructed for it, among them the Luzhniki Stadium and the Olympic Stadium.

Promyslov also oversaw the completion of the administrative subdivisions reform, which divided Moscow into 20 rayons. This reform is now considered unsuccessful and was reverted during the 1990s.

1908 births
1993 deaths
Soviet politicians
Chairpersons of the Executive Committee of Mossovet
Burials in Troyekurovskoye Cemetery